Goura is a village in Centre Province, Cameroon. Cocoa production is a source of income for residents in Goura. The Ndjim River runs through Goura.

See also
 List of municipalities of Cameroon

References

External links
 Gazetteering.com information about Goura

Populated places in Centre Region (Cameroon)